Guyana Defence Force FC, colloquially known simply as Defence Force is a Guyanese football club in Georgetown. The club competes in the GFF Elite League, the top league of football in Guyana. The club is fielded by the nation's defence force and military.

References

Football clubs in Guyana
1965 establishments in British Guiana
Military association football clubs